Per Johan Jansen (14 December 1941 – 8 August 2022) was a Norwegian stage and film actor.

Life and career
Jansen was born in Bergen on 14 December 1941. He made his stage debut at Det Norske Teatret in 1966. He later had assignments at Oslo Nye Teater, Riksteatret, Hålogaland Teater, Trøndelag Teater, Nationaltheatret and Fjernsynsteatret. He played the title character in the film Ballad of the Masterthief Ole Hoiland from 1970, and the main character in the films A Commuter Kind of Love from 1979 and Hud from 1986. Jansen died on 8 August 2022, at the age of 80.

References

1941 births
2022 deaths
Actors from Bergen
Norwegian male film actors
Norwegian male stage actors
20th-century Norwegian male actors
21st-century Norwegian male actors